The women's 100 metres event at the 2019 Summer Universiade was held on 8 and 9 July at the Stadio San Paolo in Naples.

Medalists

Results

Preliminaries
Qualification: First 4 in each heat (Q) and next 3 fastest (q) qualified for the heats.

Wind:Heat 1: -0.4 m/s, Heat 2: -1.4 m/s

Heats
Qualification: First 2 in each heat (Q) and next 8 fastest (q) qualified for the semifinals.

Wind:Heat 1: -0.5 m/s, Heat 2: -0.2 m/s, Heat 3: +0.4 m/s, Heat 4: -0.9 m/s, Heat 5: +0.1 m/s, Heat 6: +0.1 m/s, Heat 7: -0.5 m/s, Heat 8: +0.3 m/s

Semifinals
Qualification: First 2 in each heat (Q) and next 2 fastest (q) qualified for the final.

Wind:Heat 1: -0.8 m/s, Heat 2: -0.5 m/s, Heat 3: +0.1 m/s

Final

Wind: 0.0 m/s

References

100
2017